Pablo Puyol Ledesma (born 26 December 1975) is a Spanish actor, dancer and singer. He is most known for appearing as Hugo in 45 episodes of Arrayán TV Series and in 24 episodes of Ciega a citas as Alberto.

Biography 
He was born in Málaga. After starting biology, he studied drama in the Escuela Superior de Arte Dramático de Málaga. He started as a professional actor in Madrid with the musical Grease.

He made roles in several TV series and short films before he joined the famous Antena 3 TV series Un paso adelante thanks to his talents in dancing and singing.

In 2000, he played the role of Asier in En malas compañías (named in English as Doors Cut Down), then in 2005 he played the role of Raul, "el reponedor" in the movie 20 Centimeters which won many prizes at the Málaga International Film Festival, he also played part in the movie Clandestinos starring with actor Israel Rodrigues.

On 6 February 2014 he appeared in the show Tu cara me suena (on Antena 3), the Spanish version of Your Face Sounds Familiar, as a guest impersonating Vanilla Ice, and he was postulated as a favorite to appear in the fourth season of the contest. On 29 July 2015 the rumors were confirmed, and it became official his participation in the fourth season of Tu cara me suena where he eventually finished third.

Personal life
He is a vegan from 2012 and he collaborates with the International Organization in defense of the Animal Equality.

In 2018, he dated journalist Irene Junquera.

Filmography

References

External links
 Official Website
 

1975 births
Living people
People from Málaga
Spanish male singers
Spanish male dancers
Spanish male musical theatre actors
Spanish male television actors
Spanish male film actors
20th-century Spanish male actors
Male actors from Andalusia
21st-century Spanish male actors